Leftwich is a village in Cheshire, England.  It has been absorbed into the town of Northwich, and is situated within the unitary authority of Cheshire West and Chester. The name, given as merely 'Wice' in the Domesday Book of 1086, is written 'Leftetewych' in a document of 1278 and derives from 'Leoftæt's wic' (Leoftæt being a woman's name).

Leftwich was historically a manor and township, comprising most of the area between the rivers Weaver and Dane. As well as encompassing the area around Davenham parish church, Leftwich also extended slightly to the north of the River Dane, including the site of the former Northwich Memorial Hall.

In 1894 the northern half of Leftwich, which since 1880 had formed part of the Northwich Local Board district, was added to the civil parish and urban district of Northwich. In 1936 Leftwich civil parish ceased to exist, and all of its population was transferred to the civil parish of Davenham; however, most of the same area was subsequently annexed to Northwich in 1955, following the post-war construction of a large housing estate at Leftwich Green by Northwich Urban District Council.

The village has two schools: Leftwich Community Primary School and The County High School, Leftwich.

Leftwich is to the east of Kingsmead and to the north of Davenham.

References

Villages in Cheshire
Former civil parishes in Cheshire
Northwich